The Northamptonshire Police, Fire and Crime Commissioner (PFCC) is the elected official charged with overseeing Northamptonshire Police and the Northamptonshire Fire and Rescue Service and ensuring both, the police and the fire service are operating efficiently and effectively within the county of Northamptonshire.

The current PFCC is Stephen Mold; he assumed office on 5 May 2016 as the Police and Crime Commissioner, before the role began to govern the fire service on 1 January 2019 and became formally known as the "Police, Fire and Crime Commissioner".

Police force 
The PFCC is responsible for the totality of policing within Northamptonshire and holding the chief constable accountable for their actions. Northamptonshire Police remain responsible for the operational side of law enforcement within the county, whereas the commissioner is mainly responsible for the financial and political side.

Police and crime plan 
Every term, the PFCC is to create a Police and Crime Plan which will outlay their plans for budgeting, strategy and performance monitoring for Northamptonshire Police.

This term, Stephen Mold's primary goals laid out in his Police and Crime Plan, are but not limited to:
 Preventing Crime and steering young people in a law abiding direction.
 Liaising with the National Health Service to better provide mental health services.
 Assigning a dedicated Police community support officer to each neighbourhood.
 Creating cloud based technology so police officers can deal with paper work when in the field on mobile devices and also allowing members of the public to report crime online.
 Sharing resources between the police force and the fire and rescue service.

Fire and rescue service 
As a result of the Police, Fire and Crime Commissioner for Northamptonshire (Fire and Rescue Authority) Order 2018 and as of 1 January 2019, the governance of Northamptonshire Fire and Rescue Service is the responsibility of the PFCC. Prior to this change, it was the responsibility of 57 council members within the Northamptonshire County Council.

Fire and rescue plan 
Every term, the PFCC is also expected to create a Fire and Rescue Plan which will outlay their plans for improvements and budgeting for Northamptonshire Fire and Rescue Service.

This term, Stephen Mold's primary goals laid out in his Fire and Rescue Plan, are but not limited to:
 Sharing resources between the fire service and the police force.
 Creating an integrated risk management plan to review locations of high risk.
 Generate income for the fire service to reinvest into the service.
 Public and community engagement/outreach.

List of commissioners

See also
 British government departments
 Home Office
 Ministry of Justice
 Home Secretary
 Shadow Home Secretary

References

Police and crime commissioners in England